Hellmut H. Schmid (12 September 1914 – 27 April 1998) was Professor of geodesy and photogrammetry on the ETH Zürich (Switzerland), where he emerited in 1985. In the 1950s, he worked on research projects of space exploration in the United States. Between 1968 and 1974, he promoted the first intercontinental network of satellite geodesy.

Focal points of his research in Europa
 Geodetic measurement methods at the V2 project in Peenemünde (~1942)
 Beginnings of satellite geodesy 1959
 Theory of analytical photogrammetry and matrix/IT developments (1950s, USA)
 High precision evaluation of photogram (ca. 1965-1978)
 Worldwide Satellite Triangulation Network (1969-1973 (publ. 1974): first regular intercontinental network, 46 stations (3000–5000 km apart), pioneering accuracy (±3m)
 Contributions to the least-squares adjustment, network optimization, Block triangulation
 Optimization of coordinate transformations (~1975) 
 Development of 3D intersection methods in analytical photogrammetry

See also
 PAGEOS, balloon satellites, stellar triangulation
 Global reference ellipsoid, "Earth polyhedron", geodetic system, WGS84
 ETH Zürich, Ohio State University, Friedrich Hopfner

Literature
 K.Ledersteger: "'Astronomische und Physikalische Geodäsie (Erdmessung)", JEK Vol.V (870 S., espec. §§ 2, 5, 13), J.B.Metzler, Stuttgart 1968
 H.H. Schmid: "Das Weltnetz der Satellitentriangulation". Wiss. Mitteilungen ETH Zürich and Journal of Geophysical Research, 1974.
 Klaus Schnädelbach et al.: Western European Satellite Triangulation Programme (WEST), 2nd Experimental Computation. Mitteilungen Geodät.Inst. Graz 11/1, Graz 1972 
 Nothnagel, Schlüter, Seeger: Die Geschichte der geodätischen VLBI in Deutschland, Bonn 2000
 ZfV 1998: Hellmut H. Schmid † (obituary).
 Professor Dr. h.c. HellmutH. Schmid (1914- 1998)
 "Dr. Schmid leaves Aberdeen after 12 year to join staff at GIMRADA": 

Geodesists
1914 births
1998 deaths
Academic staff of ETH Zurich
Photogrammetrists
Swiss expatriates in the United States